Aspergillus granulosus is a species of fungus in the genus Aspergillus. It is from the Usti section. The species was first described in 1944. It has been reported to produce asperugins, ustic acids, nidulol, and drimans.

Growth and morphology

A. granulosus has been cultivated on both Czapek yeast extract agar (CYA) plates and Malt Extract Agar Oxoid® (MEAOX) plates. The growth morphology of the colonies can be seen in the pictures below.

References 

granulosus
Fungi described in 1944
Taxa named by Charles Thom